William Kozlowski Alves da Silva (born 19 November 1983), known as William Kozlowski, is a Brazilian footballer who plays for Athletic-MG as an attacking midfielder.

References

External links

William Kozlowski at ZeroZero

1983 births
Living people
Footballers from Curitiba
Brazilian footballers
Association football midfielders
Campeonato Brasileiro Série A players
Campeonato Brasileiro Série B players
Campeonato Brasileiro Série D players
Paraná Clube players
J. Malucelli Futebol players
Figueirense FC players
Marília Atlético Clube players
Grêmio Barueri Futebol players
Associação Atlética Caldense players
Cuiabá Esporte Clube players
Grêmio Esportivo Brasil players
Campinense Clube players
Goiás Esporte Clube players